James Ainslie may refer to:

 James Ainslie (cricketer) (1880–1953), Australian cricketer
 James Ainslie (pastoralist) (1787–1844), Scottish pastoralist